Fenestrel (INN, USAN) (developmental code name ORF-3858) is a synthetic, nonsteroidal estrogen that was developed as a postcoital contraceptive in the 1960s but was never marketed. Synthesized by Ortho Pharmaceutical in 1961 and studied extensively, it was coined the "morning-after-pill" or "postcoital antifertility agent". Fenestrel is a seco analogue of doisynolic acid, and a member of the cyclohexenecarboxylic acid series of estrogens.

See also
 Carbestrol
 Methallenestril
 Doisynoestrol
 Bisdehydrodoisynolic acid
 Anordrin

References

Carboxylic acids
Cyclohexenes
Synthetic estrogens